The 2015 Campeonato Carioca de Futebol (branded as 2015 Cariocão Guaraviton for sponsorship reasons) was the 114th edition of the top tier football of FFERJ (Federação de Futebol do Estado do Rio de Janeiro, or Rio de Janeiro State Football Federation). The top four teams competed in the 2016 Copa do Brasil.

This edition was played as a single round-robin, Guanabara Cup, followed by a semifinal and final. After each of the 16 teams played each other once, the four best placed teams qualified to the semifinals.

Participating teams

First phase (Taça Guanabara)

Relegation playoffs

Final Stage

Semi-finals

First leg

Second leg

Finals

References

External links

Campeonato Carioca seasons
Carioca